KENM or KenM may refer to:

 KENM (FM), a radio station in New Mexico
 Ken M, Internet troll